Lila Tretikov (born Olga (Lyalya) Tretyakova, January 25, 1978) is a Russian–American engineer and manager.

Early life and education
Tretikov was born in Moscow, Soviet Union. Her father is a mathematician, and her mother was a filmmaker. After moving to New York City at age 15, she learned English while waitressing and attended the University of California, Berkeley, but left before completing her degree. Her majors were computer science and art, and she researched machine learning.

Career
In 1999, Tretikov began working as a software engineer in California, where she co-authored several software patents and was a specialist in enterprise software.

Tretikov started her professional career at Sun Microsystems as an engineer at the Sun-Netscape Alliance, where she worked on the Java server. She then founded GrokDigital, a technology marketing company, and was later appointed chief information officer and vice president of engineering at SugarCRM Inc. In 2012, she was a Stevie Awards bronze winner in the category for "Female Executive of the YearBusiness Services11 to 2,500 EmployeesComputer Hardware & Software". She has co-authored several patents in intelligent data mapping and dynamic language applications.

Tretikov was appointed executive director of the Wikimedia Foundation in May 2014 in succession to Sue Gardner and took up the post on June 1, 2014. She had edited Wikipedia only once before her appointment. Tretikov resigned from the Wikimedia Foundation as a result of the WMF's controversial Knowledge Engine project and disagreements with the staff, with her last day being March 31, 2016. She was succeeded by Katherine Maher in March 2016.

On March 16, 2016, it was announced that Tretikov had been invited by the World Economic Forum to join its Young Global Leaders community. Tretikov is also on the boards of OpenEd and Rackspace, and joined the board of directors of Volvo Cars in March 2021. She joined Microsoft Corporation in 2018, and currently is listed as its Corporate Vice President & Deputy Chief Technology Officer.

See also
 List of Wikipedia people

References

External links

 User:LilaTretikov, user profile on Meta-Wiki
 Lila Tretikov Discusses NSA Lawsuit, Future of Wikipedia

1978 births
Living people
21st-century American engineers
Articles containing video clips
Russian emigrants to the United States
Sun Microsystems people
University of California, Berkeley alumni
Wikimedia Foundation staff members
American women chief executives
Women nonprofit executives
American Wikimedians

Wikipedia people
21st-century American women
Russian businesspeople in the United States